Saccharopolyspora phatthalungensis is a bacterium from the genus Saccharopolyspora. It is closely related to Saccharopolyspora shandongensis and Saccharopolyspora spinosa, but was determined to be a unique species in 2010. It was collected by being isolated from rhizospheric soil from the tree Hevea brasiliensis in Phatthalung on Thailand.

References

 

Pseudonocardineae
Bacteria described in 2010